Paradecolya briseferi is a species of katydid endemic to the islands of Mauritius, where it only occurs in a single area of 4 km2 in a preserved forest. Due to its small range and the continuing decline of its habitat, it is assessed as a critically endangered species. The main threat to P. briseferi is the decline of the native forests of Mauritius due to the gradual destruction by clearance and non-native invasive plant species. The species occurs in the oldest managed area in the Brise Fer Nature Reserve which is the best preserved relict of the native Sapotaceae forest.

References 

Insects of Mauritius
Tettigoniidae
Endemic fauna of Mauritius